Events in the year 1900 in Brazil.

Incumbents

Federal government
President: Manuel Ferraz de Campos Sales
Vice President: Francisco de Assis Rosa e Silva

Governors 
 Alagoas: Francisco Manuel dos Santos Pacheco (till 12 June); Euclides Vieira Malta (from 12 June)
 Amazonas: José Cardoso Ramalho Júnior (till 23 July); Silvério José Néri (from 23 July)
 Bahia: Luís Viana; Rodrigues Lima
 Ceará: Antônio Nogueira Accioli (till 12 July); Pedro Augusto Borges (from 12 July)
 Goiás: Urbano Coelho de Gouveia
 Maranhão: João Gualberto Torreão da Costa
 Mato Grosso: Antônio Pedro Alves de Barros
 Minas Gerais: Silviano Brandão
 Pará: Pais de Carvalho
 Paraíba: Antônio Alfredo Mello (till 22 October); José Peregrino de Araújo (from 22 October)
 Paraná: Santos Andrade; Francisco Xavier da Silva
 Pernambuco: Sigismundo Antônio Gonçalves (till 7 April); Antônio Gonçalves Ferreira (from 7 April)
 Piauí:  Raimundo Artur de Vasconcelos (till 1 July); Arlindo Francisco Nogueira (from 1 July)
 Rio Grande do Norte: Joaquim Ferreira Chaves (till 25 March); Alberto Maranhão (from 25 March)
 Rio Grande do Sul: Antônio Augusto Borges de Medeiros
 Santa Catarina:
 São Paulo: Fernando Prestes de Albuquerque (till 1 May); Francisco de Paula Rodrigues Alves (from 1 May)
 Sergipe:

Vice governors 
 Rio Grande do Norte:
 São Paulo:

Events
30 January - Luis Gálvez Rodríguez de Arias is restored to the governorship of Acre.
15 March - The Brazilian government sends troops to arrest rebel leader Luis Gálvez Rodríguez de Arias and restore the "Republic of Acre" to Bolivia.
3 June - Priest and inventor Landell de Moura publicly demonstrates a radio broadcast of the human voice. 
11 August - The football club Associação Atlética Ponte Preta is founded.
November - An attempt is made to create a Second Acre Republic with Rodrigo de Carvalho as president; it fails.

Literature
Joaquim Nabuco - Minha formação (autobiography)

Music
Heitor Villa-Lobos - Panqueca

Births
15 March - Gilberto Freyre, sociologist, anthropologist, historian, writer, painter, journalist and congressman (died 1987)
11 April - Teóphilo Bettencourt Pereira, footballer (died 1988)
4 June - Alfredo Le Pera, journalist, dramatist and lyricist (died 1935)
11 July - Filinto Müller, military-associated politician (died 1973)
October 9 - Ismael Nery, artist (died 1934)

Deaths
18 May - Karl von Kraatz-Koschlau, German geologist (born 1867; yellow fever)
date unknown - Soto Grimshaw, Argentine explorer of the Amazon region of Brazil (born 1833)

References

 
1900s in Brazil
Years of the 19th century in Brazil
Brazil
Brazil